The Provincetown Historic District encompasses most of the dense urban center of Provincetown, Massachusetts. Its historic character spans more than 200 years of settlement, from the city's early years as a fishing community, to its development as a summer resort area and artists' colony beginning in the late 19th century. The district was listed in the National Register of Historic Places in 1989. Four properties in the district are also individually listed.

First Universalist Church
The First Universalist Church, built in 1847, is the oldest church in Provincetown.  Its "Christopher Wren" tower is thought to have been inspired by the famous English architect.  It is now called the Unitarian Universalist Meeting House.

Center Methodist Church (former)
The Center Methodist Church church building is the current home of the Provincetown Public Library and former home of the town Heritage Museum.

Provincetown Public Library (former)
The former Provincetown Public Library building remained on the National Register after the library moved in 2005 to the Center Methodist Church, above.

Provincetown Post Office
The Provincetown Post Office Building on Commercial Street, still the town's only post office, was built in 1930.  It is a brick two-story building with a loggia of three rounded arches.

Gallery

See also
 National Register of Historic Places listings in Barnstable County, Massachusetts

References

External links
 The Pilgrim Monument and Provincetown Museum
 Unitarian Universalist Meeting House of Provincetown

Historic districts in Barnstable County, Massachusetts
Provincetown, Massachusetts